The 2012 Swiss Cup Basel was held from October 4 to 7 at the Curlingzentrum Region Basel in Arlesheim, Switzerland as part of the 2012–13 World Curling Tour. The event was held in a triple-knockout format, and the purse for the event was CHF40,000, of which the winner, Oskar Eriksson, received CHF13,000. Eriksson defeated Sven Michel in the final with a score of 5–4.

Teams
The teams are listed as follows:

Knockout results
The draw is listed as follows:

A event

B event

C event

Playoffs

References

External links

2012 in curling
Swiss Cup Basel